The Roman Catholic Diocese of Ruy Barbosa is a diocese located in the city of Ruy Barbosa, Bahia in the Ecclesiastical province of Feira de Santana in Brazil.

History
 November 14, 1959: Established as Diocese of Ruy Barbosa from the Diocese of Barra, Diocese of Bonfim and Metropolitan Archdiocese of São Salvador da Bahia.

Leadership
 Bishops of Ruy Barbosa (Roman rite)
 Bishop Epaminondas José de Araújo (1959.12.14 – 1966.10.27), appointed Bishop of Anápolis, Goias
 Bishop José Adelino Dantas (1967.02.20 – 1975.10.04)
 Bishop Mathias William Schmidt, O.S.B. (1976.05.14 – 1992.05.24)
 Bishop André de Witte (1994.06.08 – 2020.04.15)
 Bishop Estevam dos Santos Silva Filho (2020.04.15 – ...)

References
 GCatholic.org
 Catholic Hierarchy
 Diocese website (Portuguese) 

Roman Catholic dioceses in Brazil
Christian organizations established in 1959
Ruy Barbosa, Roman Catholic Diocese of
Roman Catholic dioceses and prelatures established in the 20th century